"Negotiate with Love" is the lead single taken from Rachel Stevens' second album, Come and Get it. The track was written by Anders Wollbeck, Mattias Lindblom, Xyloman, Miriam Nervo, and Olivia Nervo aka The Nervo Twins. It was produced by Anders Wollbeck, Mattias Lindblom and Pete Hofmann.

Release
"Negotiate with Love" was released on 28 March 2005. The single sold more than 12,500 copies in its first week, peaking at number 10 on the UK Singles Chart, giving Stevens her fourth top-10 hit.

Music video
In the video, Stevens enters her flat and six clones of her are seen destroying anything that reminds her of her previous boyfriend. She even attempts to play golf on the table with some of his figurines. Her wardrobe in the video is a navy skirt and suit jacket. During the first chorus, Stevens removes the jacket revealing a pink sweater. The video, shot in London, was directed by Harvey and Carolyn, produced by Kate Phillips and commissioned by Cynthia Lole.

Track list and formats
CD 1
"Negotiate With Love" – 3:07
"Some Girls" (Europa XL radio mix) – 6:38

CD 2
"Negotiate With Love" – 3:07
"Negotiate With Love" (Love To Infinity radio edit) – 3:45
"Queen" (Anders Hansson, Kara DioGuardi) – 3:32
"Interview" – 6:11
"Negotiate With Love" (CD-ROM video)
"Negotiate With Love" (karaoke video)
"Negotiate With Love" (PC game)
"Negotiate With Love" (ringtone)
The Remixes
"Negotiate With Love" (Love To Infinity radio edit)
"Negotiate With Love" (Love To Infinity club mix)
"Negotiate With Love" (Tom Neville club radio edit)
"Negotiate With Love" (Tom Neville club mix)

Charts

Weekly charts

Year-end charts

References

2005 singles
Rachel Stevens songs
Songs written by Anders Wollbeck
Songs written by Mattias Lindblom
Songs written by Olivia Nervo
Songs written by Miriam Nervo
2005 songs